

Champions
Temple Cup: Cleveland Spiders over Baltimore Orioles (4–1)
National League: Baltimore Orioles

National League final standings

National League statistical leaders

Batting average: Jesse Burkett – .405
Home runs: Sam Thompson – 18
Runs batted in: Sam Thompson – 165
Wins: Cy Young – 35
Earned run average: Al Maul – 2.45
Strikeouts: Amos Rusie – 201

Notable seasons
Philadelphia Phillies right fielder Sam Thompson led the NL in home runs (18), total bases (352), slugging percentage (.654), and runs batted in (165). He was second in the NL in adjusted OPS+ (176). He was third in the NL in hits (211). He was fourth in the NL in batting average (.392).
Pittsburgh Pirates pitcher Pink Hawley had a win–loss record of 31–22 and led the NL in innings pitched (444.1) and shutouts (4). He was second in the NL in wins (31) and earned run average (3.18). He was third in the NL in strikeouts (142). He was fifth in the NL in adjusted ERA+ (143).

Events
February 27 – Responding to the complaints of senior citizens like Cap Anson, the National League restricts the size of gloves for all fielders, save catchers and first basemen, to 10 ounces, with a maximum circumference of 14 inches around the palm (less than 4½ inches across). The league also rescinds the rule forbidding intentional discoloring of the ball, thus allowing players to dirty the baseball to their satisfaction.
August 16 – Tommy Dowd of the St. Louis Browns hits for the cycle in an 8–5 win over the Louisville Colonels.
September 30 – Washington Senators first baseman Ed Cartwright hits for the cycle against the Boston Beaneaters.

Births

January
January 6 – Charlie Blackburn
January 9 – Ray French
January 11 – Paddy Driscoll
January 12 – Henry Bostick
January 12 – Jack Knight
January 16 – Lou Guisto
January 18 – George Hesselbacher
January 19 – Dan Boone
January 21 – Ed Sperber
January 21 – Jimmy Zinn
January 24 – Joe Cobb

February
February 2 – George Halas
February 2 – George Lees
February 2 – Burlin White
February 6 – Babe Ruth
February 9 – Wally Hood
February 12 – Sweetbread Bailey
February 15 – Larry Goetz
February 15 – Jimmy Ring
February 16 – Red Cox
February 17 – Leon Carlson
February 22 – Tony DeFate
February 22 – Roy Graham
February 22 – Ed Monroe
February 23 – Gus Sandberg
February 24 – Bill Bagwell

March
March 3 – Joe Jaeger
March 4 – Jesse Baker
March 8 – Jack Bentley
March 9 – Frank Kane
March 10 – Jake Propst
March 13 – Eric Erickson
March 13 – Alejandro Oms
March 17 – Lyman Lamb
March 23 – Frank Parkinson
March 26 – Joe Klugmann
March 27 – Bill Burwell
March 31 – Carson Bigbee

April
April 2 – Earl Pruess
April 8 – Eddie Bacon
April 10 – Bob McGraw
April 11 – Ralph Sharman
April 12 – Sammy Vick
April 18 – Hans Rasmussen
April 22 – Bob Smith
April 23 – Tom Knowlson
April 24 – Harry Harper
April 24 – Dixie Parker
April 25 – George Lowe
April 26 – Buzz Murphy

May
May 3 – Bob Pepper
May 3 – Chick Tolson
May 4 – Charlie Babington
May 8 – Ed Murray
May 10 – Pat Hardgrove
May 12 – Jim Poole
May 13 – Red Lanning
May 13 – Frank Mills
May 15 – Joe Evans
May 15 – Jimmy Smith
May 16 – Colonel Snover
May 19 – Ray Kennedy
May 24 – Gus Felix
May 25 – Jim Riley
May 30 – Harry Salmon

June
June 2 – Al Baird
June 3 – Johnny Bassler
June 5 – Ray Rohwer
June 8 – Sam McConnell
June 13 – Emilio Palmero
June 14 – Ike Davis
June 21 – Oliver Marcelle
June 23 – Jack Smith
June 23 – George Weiss
June 25 – Bill Webb
June 30 – Johnny Miljus

July
July 2 – Frank Thompson
July 5 – George Kopshaw
July 9 – Joe Gleason
July 12 – Artie Dede
July 19 – Snake Henry
July 23 – Art Rico
July 29 – Dutch Stryker

August
August 1 – Clem Llewellyn
August 4 – Hooks Foreman
August 7 – Ed Gill
August 9 – Willis Flournoy
August 10 – Joe Schepner
August 16 – Fred Bailey
August 20 – Pete Schneider
August 24 – Les Howe
August 25 – Ray Roberts
August 26 – Axel Lindstrom
August 29 – Guy Morrison

September
September 5 – Ted Jourdan
September 6 – Shags Horan
September 10 – George Kelly
September 15 – Hugh McQuillan
September 21 – Ad Swigler
September 22 – Austin McHenry
September 23 – Johnny Mokan
September 26 – Bernie Neis
September 28 – Hal Bubser
September 28 – Whitey Witt
September 30 – Dick Cox

October
October 1 – Carmen Hill
October 1 – Roy Johnson
October 3 – Bert Lewis
October 4 – Ralph Shinners
October 5 – Norm McMillan
October 7 – Fred Fussell
October 8 – Ed Wingo
October 13 – Mike Gazella
October 13 – Ben Paschal
October 13 – Jim Roberts
October 16 – Bill Skiff
October 18 – Babe Pinelli
October 18 – Tom Sullivan
October 20 – John Russell
October 22 – Johnny Morrison
October 24 – Al Pierotti
October 27 – Clarence Huber
October 30 – Thomas Healy

November
November 3 – Felton Stratton
November 3 – Jim Walkup
November 3 – Kid Willson
November 4 – Bill McCarren
November 5 – Tom McNamara
November 5 – Rasty Wright
November 8 – Mike Knode
November 10 – Chick Fewster
November 10 – Slicker Parks
November 10 – Bill Summers
November 11 – Cy Morgan
November 13 – George Dumont 
November 17 – George Scott
November 19 – Billy Zitzmann
November 23 – Dallas Bradshaw
November 25 – Jakie May
November 26 – George Tomer
November 28 – Bill Anderson
November 28 – Molly Craft
November 29 – Jack Enright

December
December 1 – Jake Miller
December 2 – Art Jahn
December 7 – Bud Davis
December 25 – Frank Ellerbe
December 25 – Herb Hunter
December 26 – Bonnie Hollingsworth
December 26 – Herman Pillette
December 29 – Clyde Barnhart

Deaths
January 10 – Steve Ladew, 32, outfielder/pitcher for the Kansas City Cowboys of the American Association.
January 15 – Ed Silch, 29, pitcher for the 1888 Brooklyn Bridegrooms of the National League.
January 21 – Frank Bowes, 30, backup catcher/outfielder/infielder for the 1890 Brooklyn Gladiators of the American Association.
January 29 – Tony Suck, 36, catcher who played with the Buffalo Bisons of the National League (1883) and for the Baltimore Monumentals and Chicago Browns of the Union Association (1884).
February 8 – Roger Carey, 30, second baseman for the 1889 New York Giants of the National League.
March 2 – Kid Camp, 25, National League pitcher who played for the 1892 Pittsburgh Pirates and the 1894 Chicago Colts.
March 30 – Henry Easterday, 30, shortstop who played for five teams of two different leagues between the 1884 and 1890 seasons.
April 16 – Jack McQuaid, 36, American Association and National League umpire from 1886 to 1894.
April 18 – Henry Myers, 36, shortstop and manager for the 1882 Baltimore Orioles, who also played part of two seasons with the Providence Grays and the Wilmington Quicksteps.
April 21 – Jim Tipper, 45, National Association outfielder who played for the Middletown Mansfields, Hartford Dark Blues, and New Haven Elm Citys teams between the 1869 and 1875 seasons.
April 23 – Long John Ewing, 31, pitcher/outfielder for six teams in four different leagues between 1883 and 1891, who led all National League pitchers with a 2.27 earned run average in his last major league season.
June 21 – Rex Smith, 31, pitcher for the 1886 Philadelphia Athletics of the American Association.
July 8 – Steve King, 53, outfielder who played from 1871 to 1872 for the Troy Haymakers of the National Association.
August 8 – Billy Colgan, (?), catcher for the 1884 Pittsburgh Alleghenys of the American Association.
October 3 – Harry Wright, 60, Hall of Fame player/manager and organizer of baseball's first professional team, the 1869 Cincinnati Red Stockings, who is recognized as the first major league manager to collect 1000 career victories.
October 16 – Kid Summers, 27, Canadian catcher and outfielder who played for the 1893 St. Louis Browns of the National League.
November 9 – George Joyce, 48, center fielder for the 1886 Washington Nationals of the National League.
November 16 – Jim McLaughlin, 34, pitcher/outfielder for the 1884 Baltimore Orioles of the American Association.
November 20 – Dick Hunt, 48, right fielder/second baseman for the 1872 Brooklyn Eckfords of the National Association.
December 12 – Harry Fuller, 33, third baseman for the 1891 St. Louis Browns of the American Association.

References

External links
1895 National League season team stats at Baseball Reference